Bundesrat is a German word that means federal council and may refer to:
 Federal Council (Austria)
 Bundesrat of Germany
 Federal Council (Switzerland)
 Bundesrat (German Empire)